The Betrothed (original Italian title:I promessi sposi)  is a 1964 Italian-Spanish historical drama film directed by Mario Maffei and starring Gil Vidal, Maria Silva and Arturo Dominici. It is based on the 1827 novel The Betrothed by Alessandro Manzoni, one of three film adaptations made during the twentieth century.

Plot summary
Lombardy: 1629. Renzo Tramaglino and Lucia Mondella are two poor farmers who are in love, but they are hampered by the wickedness of the powerful Don Rodrigo, who secretly loves Lucia. The two run away from Lake Como where they live, and take refuge inland. Renzo goes to Milan by a cousin, while Lucia is hiding in the convent of Monza, where he meets the Lady. Don Rodrigo, however, kidnaps Lucia from a friend of his: the Unnamed, who leads her in his castle. Lucia with prayers can move the cruel man, who lets her go. But now there's another issue that prevents Renzo and Lucia to meet: the plague.

Cast
Gil Vidal as Renzo Tramaglino
Maria Silva as Lucia Mondella
Arturo Dominici as Cardinale Federigo Borromeo
Manuel Monroy as Don Rodrigo
Ivo Garrani as l'Innominato
Carlo Campanini as Don Abbondio
Amalia Rodriguez as Agnese
Lilla Brignone as Perpetua
Ilaria Occhini as Gertrude 
Umberto Raho as Fra Cristoforo
Paolo Carlini as Egidio

References

Bibliography 
 Buonanno, Milly. Italian TV Drama and Beyond: Stories from the Soil, Stories from the Sea. Intellect Books, 2012.

External links 
 

1964 films
Italian historical drama films
Spanish historical drama films
1960s historical drama films
1960s Italian-language films
Films directed by Mario Maffei
Films based on Italian novels
Films based on works by Alessandro Manzoni
Films scored by Carlo Rustichelli
Films set in 1629
Films set in Lombardy
1964 drama films
1960s Italian films